The badminton men's singles tournament at the 1992 Summer Olympics took place from 28 July to 4 August at Pavelló de la Mar Bella. The men's singles resulted in the only non-Asian medallist, Thomas Stuer-Lauridsen of Denmark.  56 players from 32 nations competed in men's singles.

Draws

First rounds

Section 1

Section 2

Section 3

Section 4

Finals

References

External links 
 Men's singles draws and results at the 1992 Summer Olympics - InternationalBadminton.org

Badminton at the 1992 Summer Olympics
Men's events at the 1992 Summer Olympics